Lee Vertis Swinton (August 9, 1922 – July 9, 1994) was an American politician who became the first African-American to serve in the Missouri Senate from the Kansas City area. He was a Democrat. He was a former Kansas City NAACP president.

References

1922 births
1994 deaths
Politicians from Kansas City, Missouri
African-American state legislators in Missouri
Democratic Party Missouri state senators
20th-century American politicians
NAACP activists
20th-century African-American politicians